Cyptonychia is a genus of moths of the family Noctuidae.

Species
 Cyptonychia anaemica (Draudt, 1827)
 Cyptonychia dulcita (Schaus, 1898)
 Cyptonychia muricolor (Dyar, [1927])
 Cyptonychia pseudovarra (Dyar, [1927])
 Cyptonychia salacon (Druce, 1895)
 Cyptonychia simplicia (Dyar, [1927])
 Cyptonychia spreta (Draudt, 1927)
 Cyptonychia subfumosa (Dyar, 1909)
 Cyptonychia varrara (Dyar, 1918)

Former species
 Cyptonychia thoracica is now Chrysoecia thoracica (H. Edwards, 1884)

References
Natural History Museum Lepidoptera genus database
Cyptonychia at funet

Hadeninae